Harley Christian Erskine Anderson (February 3, 1884 – April 17, 1934) was a Canadian politician. He served in the Legislative Assembly of British Columbia from 1933 to 1934 from the electoral district of North Vancouver, a member of the Co-operative Commonwealth Federation party.

References

1884 births
1934 deaths